Alderson is a surname. Notable people with the surname include:

Brian Alderson, Scottish footballer
Bryce Alderson (born 1994), Canadian soccer player
Dale Alderson (1918–1982), American baseball pitcher
Dan Alderson, American scientist and participant in science fiction fandom
Edward Alderson (judge) (c. 1787–1857), an English lawyer and judge
Edward Alderson (parliamentary clerk) (1864–1951), an English lawyer and public servant 
Edwin Alderson, British general during Boer Wars and World War I
Frederic Alderson, English rugby union international captain
Helen Popova Alderson, Russian and British mathematician
Kristen Alderson, American actress appearing on daytime soap opera One Life To Live
Mozelle Alderson (1904–1994), American classic female blues singer
Samuel W. Alderson, inventor of the crash-test dummy
Sandy Alderson, American baseball executive

Fictional characters 
Elliot Alderson, lead character on the television series Mr. Robot, played by Rami Malek